Wakashio (Japanese: わかしお) is a Japanese limited express train service operated by JR East.

Wakashio may also refer to:

 Wakashio Bank, a Japanese bank and financial services company
 MV Wakashio oil spill (2020), off of Pointe d'Esny, Mauritius
 Wakashio (ship), several ships of that name
 Japanese submarine Wakashio, several submarines

See also